Konina  is a village in the administrative district of Gmina Niedźwiedź, within Limanowa County, Lesser Poland Voivodeship, in southern Poland.

The village has a population of 2,008.

References

Villages in Limanowa County